Larkin's Hill Farm is a historic home at Harwood, Anne Arundel County, Maryland, United States. It is a -story gambrel-roofed brick house with a 20th-century wing. In 1683 the estate served as a temporary capital of Maryland. John Larkin, an early Quaker settler in the area, later operated an inn here as a stopping place on the first regular postal route in Maryland, which ran from St. Mary's City to Annapolis. The present brick house was built during the ownership of Lord High Sheriff of Annapolis Captain John Gassaway, the grandson of pioneer politician Colonel Nicholas Gassaway, shortly after his acquisition of the property in 1753.

Larkin's Hill Farm was listed on the National Register of Historic Places in 1969.

References

External links
, including photo from 1992, at Maryland Historical Trust

Houses on the National Register of Historic Places in Maryland
Houses in Anne Arundel County, Maryland
Quakerism in Maryland
Houses completed in 1753
Historic American Buildings Survey in Maryland
National Register of Historic Places in Anne Arundel County, Maryland